TACOMSAT (also known as TACSAT 1, OPS 0757, or Tactical Communications Satellite) was a communications satellite designed and built by Hughes Aircraft Corporation under the direction of the United States Air Force Space and Missile Systems Organization (SAMSO).  TACOMSAT was used by the United States Department of Defense to explore the feasibility of geostationary satellite communications between ground stations comprising fixed bases, military field units, aircraft, and ships.

Construction 
The -long main cylinder of the HS-308 bus was spin-stabilized at 54 rpm with the antennas mounted to a despun platform in an early version of the Hughes Gyrostat design. The platform was equipped with a variety of antennas, including a five-element UHF bifilar helical antenna array, two X band horn antennas, and a biconical antenna for telemetry and control.

The UHF transponder could provide a maximum RF output of 230 watts over a 10 MHz bandwidth, while the X band transponder could provide 30 watts over 10 MHz of bandwidth.  The two transponders could be interconnected, allowing all signals to be exchanged between bands with a reduced usable bandwidth of 425 kHz.

This permitted remotely deployed field units to communicate with one another and with headquarters. High RF power also permitted simultaneous access by many users across the transponder bandwidth.

Mission 
After a February 9, 1969 launch on a Titan IIIC launch vehicle, TACOMSAT reached a geostationary transfer orbit over the Pacific Ocean.  After more than three years of successful experiments by the US Army, US Air Force, and US Navy, TACSAT was decommissioned on December 16, 1972.

References

Reconnaissance satellites of the United States
Cancelled spacecraft